Datooga (also Datog, Datoga, Taturu, Mang'ati, Tatoga or Tatog) is a Nilotic language or dialect cluster of the Southern Nilotic group. It is spoken by the Datooga people of the Great Rift Valley of Tanzania. The Sukuma name Taturu is also sometimes used in English; the Swahili name Mang'ati comes from Maasai, where it means "enemy". However, it is not considered offensive to the Datooga, as there is a degree of pride in being the historic enemy of the Maasai, and Mang'ati has become the standard name for the group in Swahili. In addition, numerous tribal and dialectal names may be found for the people or language as a whole. 

The Datooga have been claimed to be one of the least educated peoples in Tanzania, and there is almost no literacy in the language; literacy in Swahili has been reported to be very low in some communities. However, the Barabaiga and Gisamjanga dialects have been written, and some work is being done on Asimjeeg.

Varieties
Dialect diversity is great enough to make mutual intelligibility difficult, and Blench (2000) lists East Datooga and West Datooga as distinct languages. Dialects are often assumed to correspond to the seven Datooga tribes, but the speech of the Gisamjanga (Kisamajeng, Gisamjang) and the Barabaig, for example, are very close, and can be considered a single dialect. The other dialects, with alternate spellings, are Bajuta, Barabayiiga (Barabaig, Barabayga, Barabaik, Barbaig), Asimjeeg (Tsimajeega, Isimijeega), Rootigaanga (Rotigenga, Rotigeenga), Buraadiiga (Buradiga, Bureadiga), Bianjiida (Biyanjiida, Utatu).

A 1997 dialect survey includes data from four Datooga varieties:
Bianjida (the most divergent)
Gisamjanga (including Bajuta)
Barabaiga
Buradiga
Asimjeeg
Gidang'oodiga (a special blacksmith group)

Grammar
Datooga has been strongly influenced by South Cushitic languages previously spoken in the area where Datooga has taken over. In turn, Datooga has strongly influenced the Iraqw language which has occupied much former Datooga territory and has absorbed Datooga through intermarriage; for example, the Iraqw use Datooga vocabulary for poetic language. 

Some varieties of Datooga have a verb-initial word order, but the relative order of subject and object reflects pragmatic concerns. Grammatical case in the Gisamjanga variety is marked by tone in a marked nominative system. Numbers follow nouns, and question words come at the end of a clause. The numeral system is vigesimal, but domestic animals are counted in pairs, so that the word used for 'five' when counting other objects means 'ten' when referring to goats or cattle.

Phonology

A retroflex /ɭ/ may also be present in some dialects. /q/ may have different realizations, being heard as [ɢ χ ʁ] in various positions.

Plosives are devoiced word-finally and when adjacent to another plosive or a fricative. Datooga  is underlyingly  (or equivalently ); the voiceless [t] is longer than a voiced [d]. There is also no distinction between [h] and a zero onset to a syllable.

Sounds /i ɛ a u/ may also be heard as [ɪ æ ɑ ʊ] in free variation.

Final vowels are often devoiced in Gisamjanga and Barabaig, as may be the consonants which proceed them, which is why Barabayiiga for example is commonly transcribed as Barabaik.

References

 Rottland, Franz. 1982. Die Südnilotischen Sprachen: Beschreibung, Vergleichung und Rekonstruktion. (Kölner Beiträge zur Afrikanistik, 7.) Berlin: Dietrich Reimer Verlag. 153-196.

External links
 Asimjeeg Datooga DoReCo corpus compiled by Richard Griscom. Audio recordings of narrative texts, with transcriptions time-aligned at the phone level and translations.

Southern Nilotic languages
Languages of Tanzania